"Beep" is the first official single from Bobby V's third studio album The Rebirth. The single features Yung Joc and is produced by Mississippi native Leland Clopton AKA Big Fruit.
"Beep" contains a sample of the 1985 hit "Moments in Love" by Art of Noise.

Concept
The up-tempo track details the joys of adventurous sex. In regards to his newest track Bobby notes,

Songwriters
Robinson, Wilson, Leland Clopton, Courtney Stewart, and Orlando Reid collaborated on writing the song.

Music video
The music video debuted via 106 & Park on December 2, 2008 and features cameo appearances from Chingy, DJ Drama, Lloyd, Sean Garrett, Rocko, V.I.C. and Buckeey from Flavor of Love 2 and Marvin Williams from the Atlanta Hawks.

Official remix
The official remix features Ludacris, Lil' Kim and Lil Wayne and was released on February 3, 2009. Another remix was released Bobby V's Lights, Camera & R&B mixtape featuring Lil Wayne & Maino. Lil Wayne's verse is slightly different in this version.

Charts

Weekly charts

Year-end charts

References

2008 singles
Bobby V songs
Yung Joc songs
2008 songs
Songs written by Bob Robinson (songwriter)